Čikerija may refer to:

Csikéria, village in southeastern Hungary
Radičević, village in autonomous province of Vojvodina, northern Serbia